ISO/TC 176 is Technical Committee 176 of the International Organization for Standardization (ISO), responsible for Quality management and quality assurance - the ISO 9000 family of standards.

Overview 
The scope of the committee is ‘Standardization in the field of quality management (generic quality management systems and supporting technologies), as well as quality management standardization in specific sectors at the request of the affected sector and the ISO Technical Management Board’.

Membership is open to any national body, in much the same way as membership in either of the two parent organizations. A member can be either participating (P) or observing (O) and the difference is mainly the ability to vote on proposed standards and other products. Other organizations participate as Liaison Members, some internal to ISO and IEC and some external. There is no requirement for any member body to maintain either (or any) status on all of the sub-committees. Sub-committees, working groups, task groups and other bodies can be created to deal with new situations or disbanded if the area of work is no longer relevant.

Secretariat: Standards Council of Canada (SCC)

ISO committees in liaison:
ISO/IEC JTC 1/SC 7, ISO/IEC JTC 1/SC 36, ISO/IEC JTC 1/SC 40,ISO/TC 22, ISO/TC 34/SC 17, ISO/TC 37, ISO/TC 46/SC 11, ISO/TC 69, ISO/TC 85, ISO/TC 207, ISO/TC 210, ISO/TC 212, ISO/TC 213, ISO/TC 232, ISO/TC 224, ISO/TC 260, ISO/TC 267, ISO/TC 279, ISO/TC 286, ISO/TC304, ISO/TC 323, ISO/CASCO

IEC committees in liaison:
IEC/IECQ-CMC, IEC/TC 56

Organizations in liaison:
AKMS, ASQ, CI, CLEPA, EAQUALS, EC, EOQ, FIDIC, IAEA, IAF, IDEA, ILAC, INLAC, IPC, IQNet, ITC, OAS, OIE, QuEST, SEMATECH, CQI, Venice Commission, WASPaLM, WHO

Working Groups:
 ISO/TC 176/CSAG: Chair's Strategic Advisory Group
 ISO/TC 176/STTF: Spanish translation task force
 ISO/TC 176/TF : ISO 9001 Auditing Practices Group
 ISO/TC 176/TG 1: Communications and product support
 ISO/TC 176/TG 2: ISO 9001 Brand Integrity
 ISO/TC 176/TG 4: Future concepts in quality management

Subcommittees 
Most work is done by subcommittees (SC) dealing with a particular field. The subcommittees usually have several working groups (WG). Large WGs can have task groups (TG). The Subcommittees are:

 ISO/TC 176/SC 1: Concepts and terminology
 ISO/TC 176/SC 2: Quality systems
 ISO/TC 176/SC 3: Supporting technologies

ISO/TC 176/SC 1: Concepts and terminology 
 ISO/TC 176/SC 1/TG 2 	Consistency of use of concepts, terms and definitions in ISO/TC 176 standards
 ISO/TC 176/SC 1/TG 3 	Harmonization of terms and definitions with other bodies
 ISO/TC 176/SC 1/WG 1 	Development of ISO 9000

Secretariat: American National Standards Institute (ANSI)

ISO committees in liaison:
ISO/IEC JTC 1/SC 7, ISO/TC 37, ISO/TC 37/SC 2, ISO/TC 46/SC 11, ISO/TC 69/SC 1, ISO/TC 184/SC 5, ISO/TC 207/SC 1, ISO/TC 210, ISO/TC 258, ISO/TC 260, ISO/TC 279, ISO/CASCO

IEC committees in liaison:
IEC/TC 1, IEC/TC 56

Organizations in liaison:
EC, ILAC, INLAC, OIML, QuEST, CQI, WHO

Published Standards:
 ISO 9000:2015 Quality management systems — Fundamentals and vocabulary

ISO/TC 176/SC 2: Quality systems 
 ISO/TC 176/SC 2/AG1: Strategic planning and operations
 ISO/TC 176/SC 2/TG1: Quality management principles
 ISO/TC 176/SC 2/TG4: Interpretations

Secretariat: BSI

ISO committees in liaison:
ISO/IEC JTC 1/SC 7, ISO/TC 20, ISO/TC 34, ISO/TC 46/SC 11, ISO/TC 67, ISO/TC 69, ISO/TC 176/SC 1, ISO/TC 207/SC 1, ISO/TC 210, ISO/TC 251, ISO/TC 258, ISO/TC 262, ISO/TC 279, ISO/PC 283, ISO/CASCO

IEC committees in liaison:
IEC/IECQ-CMC,  IEC/SC 31M, IEC/TC 56

Organizations in liaison:
AKMS, CI, CLEPA,  EC, EOQ, FIDIC, FUNDIBEQ, IAF, IAQG, IATF, IECQ, IIOC, ILAC, INLAC, IPC, International Project Management Association (IPMA), IQNet, OIML, QuEST, CQI, WHO

Published Standards:
 ISO 9001:2015 Quality management systems — Requirements
 ISO/TS 9002:2016 Guidelines on the application of ISO 9001:2015
 ISO 9004:2018 Quality management - Quality of an organization - Guidance to achieve sustained success
 ISO 10005:2018 Quality management systems — Guidelines for quality plans
 ISO 10006:2017 Quality management systems — Guidelines for quality in projects
 ISO 10007:2017 Quality management systems — Guidelines for configuration management

ISO/TC 176/SC 3: Supporting technologies 
 ISO/TC 176/SC 3/CAG: Chairman Advisory Group
 ISO/TC 176/SC 3/JWG 20 Joint ISO/TC 176/SC 3 - ISO/TC 260 WG: Revision of ISO 10015
 ISO/TC 176/SC 3/JWG 21 Joint ISO/TC 176/SC 3 - ISO/TC 260 WG: Revision of ISO 10018
 ISO/TC 176/SC 3/TF 1 	CSLT
 ISO/TC 176/SC 3/WG 19 Revision of ISO 10013 - Guidelines for quality management system documentation
 ISO/TC 176/SC 3/WG 22 Revision of ISO/TR 10017 - Guidance on statistical techniques for ISO 9001
 ISO/TC 176/SC 3/WG 23 Revision of ISO 10014 - Quality management - Guidelines for realizing financial and economic benefits

Secretariat: Nederlands Normalisatie-instituut (NEN)

ISO committees in liaison:
ISO/IEC JTC 1/SC 7, ISO/TC 46/SC 11, ISO/TC 69, ISO/TC 69/SC 7, ISO/TC 69/SC 8, ISO/TC 207/SC 2, ISO/TC 290, ISO/CASCO

IEC committees in liaison:
None

Organizations in liaison:
EC, EOQ, INLAC, OECD, OIML, CQI

Published Standards:
 ISO 10001:2018 Quality management — Customer satisfaction — Guidelines for codes of conduct for organizations
 ISO 10002:2018 Quality management — Customer satisfaction — Guidelines for complaints handling in organizations	
 ISO 10003:2018 Quality management — Customer satisfaction — Guidelines for dispute resolution external to organizations
 ISO 10004:2018 Quality management — Customer satisfaction — Guidelines for monitoring and measuring
 ISO 10008:2013 Quality management-Customer satisfaction - Guidelines for business-to-consumer electronic commerce transactions
 ISO/CD 10009 Quality management — Guidance for quality tools and their application
 ISO/FDIS 10010 Quality management — Guidance to understand, evaluate and improve organizational quality culture
 ISO 10012:2003 Measurement management systems—Requirements for measurement processes and measuring equipment
 ISO 10013:2021 Quality management systems — Guidance for documented information
 ISO 10014:2021 Quality management systems — Managing an organization for quality results — Guidance for realizing financial and economic benefits
 ISO 10015:2019 Quality management — Guidelines for competence management and people development
 ISO 10017:2021 Quality management — Guidance on statistical techniques for ISO 9001:2015
 ISO 10018:2020 Quality management - Quality management — Guidance for people engagement
 ISO 10019:2005 Guidelines for the selection of quality management system consultants and use of their services
 ISO/PRF TS 10020 Quality management systems — Organizational change management — Processes

See also 

 List of ISO Technical Committees

References

External links 
 ISO home page
 ISO/TC 176 
 Committee page 

 
176